HMNZS Wakakura (T00) was originally a First World War  naval trawler built in Canada. Ordered by the Admiralty, the vessel, named TR 1, was loaned to the Royal Canadian Navy for use on the East Coast of Canada. She was purchased by New Zealand in 1926 and transferred to the Royal New Zealand Navy when it was established in 1941.

She displaced 530 tons standard, could manage  and was equipped with a  gun during World War II.

Wakakura is a Māori word which  means "precious canoe" or "training boat"

War service
Wakakura remained in commission throughout the Second World War as a training vessel and minesweeper. For the first part of the war she was part of the 28th Minesweeper Flotilla, until the flotilla was transferred overseas. From then the Wakakura was based at Lyttleton.

"A little trawler paid a big part in the lives of New Zealand's pre-war and wartime naval reservists. Her Majesty's Trawler (later HMNZS) Wakakura, purchased from the Royal Navy scrap heap 'as is, where is' to be a training ship, also left an impression on various wharves and a couple of other ships as she roamed from port to port around New Zealand instructing young would-be sailors in naval procedures."

During 1944 the Wakakura reported that it had sighted and depth charged a Japanese submarine of the Canterbury Coast, possible sinking it. Naval historians concluded that while it was possible for Japanese submarines to be in the area, at that stage of the war it was unlikely.

The ship\s bell was installed in the Devonport Naval Base Chapel.

Cargo vessel
After the war in 1947 she was sold to the Tasman Steamship Company owned by a syndicate of 17 former merchant seamen. The ship was renamed SS Wakakura and converted to a refrigerated cargo vessel for use on the trans-Tasman run from Auckland and Wellington to Sydney. The ships maiden voyage as a merchant ship was in October 1947 under Captain F A Barrett from Auckland to Sydney. The newspaper stated that the voyage across the Tasman Sea was expected to take 6 days.

By 1948 the company decided that the ship was to small for the Trans-Tasman run and decided to purchase a larger vessel. The ship had made seven return voyages by the time. The Fiji Government owned motor ship Viti was acquired by the company as a replacement. When the Viti entered service the Wakakura was used for coastal shipping.

The company put the ship up for sale in November 1950.

See also
 Minesweepers of the Royal New Zealand Navy

References

 Harker, Jack S. (2006) Left hand down a bit! : the Wakakura story. Kotuku Media. 
 McDougall, R J  (1989) New Zealand Naval Vessels. Government Printing Office. 
 Walters, Sydney David (1956) The Royal New Zealand Navy: Official History of World War II, Department of Internal Affairs, Wellington Online

External links
 Wakakura Book Launch 

Ships built in Ontario
1917 ships
World War I minesweepers of the United Kingdom
Castle-class trawlers of the Royal New Zealand Navy
World War II minesweepers of New Zealand